Lucius "Tawl" Ross (born October 5, 1948, in Wagram, North Carolina) is an American musician. He was the rhythm guitarist for Funkadelic from 1968 to 1971, and played on their first three albums. He left the band in 1971 soon after a debilitating experience with LSD, which is reported to have resulted in brain damage. He moved back to North Carolina and dropped out of the music scene, but resurfaced in 1995 after a nearly 25-year absence to release a solo album, a.k.a. Detrimental Vasoline - Giant Shirley, issued by Coconut Grove Records under the name "Tal" Ross. Ross was last reported as living in Maxton, North Carolina, recording local groups in a home studio.

References

External links
The Motherpage - review of a.k.a. Detrimental Vasoline.

1948 births
Living people
People from Scotland County, North Carolina
African-American guitarists
American funk guitarists
American male guitarists
P-Funk members
20th-century American guitarists
People from Maxton, North Carolina
American soul guitarists
American rhythm and blues guitarists
Rhythm guitarists